Hygrochloa cravenii is a species of Poaceae found in the Northern Territory of Australia, as well as in northwestern Queensland. In Queensland, the species is of least concern under the Nature Conservation Act.

References

Nature Conservation Act least concern biota
Panicoideae